Stewart F. Parker is a British scientist specialising in vibrational spectroscopy and catalysis. He works at the ISIS neutron source and is an Honorary Professor in the school of Chemistry at the University of Glasgow.

Career
Parker gained his PhD at the University of California, Santa Barbara following this with postdoctoral research at the University of East Anglia. He worked for the Analytical Division of the Sunbury Research Centre before moving to the ISIS Facility in 1993.

He has an Individual Merit award from the Science and Technology Facilities Council, which was renewed in 2019.

Select publications
Parker, S. F. Horton, K. E. and Tomkinson, J. 1995. The TFXA user guide. Council for the Central Laboratory of the Research Council.
Mitchell, P. C. H, Parker, S. F., Ramirez-Cuesta, J. and Tomkinson, J. 2005. Vibrational Spectroscopy with Neutrons With Applications in Chemistry, Biology, Materials Science and Catalysis (Series on Neutron Techniques and Applications: Volume 3) .
Parker, S. F., Ramirez-Cuesta, A. J., and Daemen, L. 2018. "Vibrational spectroscopy with neutrons: Recent developments", Spectrochimica Acta Part A: Molecular and Biomolecular Spectroscopy 190. 518-523.
Parker, S. F., Mukhopadhyay, S., Jiménez‐Ruiz, M., and ALbers, P. W. 2019. "Adsorbed States of Hydrogen on Platinum: A New Perspective". Chemistry: A European Journal 25(26), 6496-6499. .

References

Year of birth missing (living people)
University of California, Santa Barbara alumni
British chemists
Living people